air2there was an airline based in New Zealand. It began service in 2004, and was based at Kapiti Coast Airport, 60 km north of Wellington. It operated scheduled services across Cook Strait. Charter services to other New Zealand destinations were also available.  Aero-medical flights were conducted from Wellington Airport using twin turbo prop aircraft. As of November 2018, air2there has not flown since June, and applications to liquidate the airline have been filed. The airline's Cessna Grand Caravan is up for sale

History
The airline was launched in October 2004 by former Paraparaumu Airport owner Murray Cole and his company Integra Investments. He saw a gap in the market by providing a quick alternative to Wellington Airport with the company to be based at Paraparaumu Airport. Flying started with one 14 seat Grand Caravan and two Chieftains. The company started with flights to Blenheim, Masterton, Wellington and Palmerston North, then Nelson and Whanganui were added in February 2005. Flights were later terminated to Masterton, Palmerston North and Whanganui at the end of 2005 when it found there was no market.
In May 2013 air2there added a Beech 200 Super King Air to their fleet. This is used for air ambulance operations supporting Life Flight Trust. In 2017 Jetstream series aircraft were added to the fleet for charter and regional services under the Originair brand.
Air 2 There was put into receivership in November 2018 with a Piper Navajo and two engines been seized.

Destinations
The following destinations were served by the airline but are currently suspended:
Blenheim (Woodbourne Airport)
Nelson (Nelson Airport)
Paraparaumu (Kapiti Coast Airport)

Fleet

See also
 List of defunct airlines of New Zealand

References

External links

air2there

Defunct airlines of New Zealand
Airlines established in 2004
Airlines disestablished in 2018
Cook Strait
2018 disestablishments in New Zealand
New Zealand companies established in 2004